Anthony Nahuel Aires Almeida (born 18 May 2004) is a Uruguayan footballer who plays as a midfielder for Liverpool Montevideo.

Career
A youth academy graduate of Liverpool Montevideo, Aires made his professional debut for the club on 16 May 2021 in a 4–2 league win against Deportivo Maldonado.

Aires is a current Uruguayan youth international. He was part of Uruguay squad at 2019 South American U-15 Championship.

Career statistics

Club

References

External links
 

2004 births
Living people
Association football midfielders
Uruguayan footballers
Uruguay youth international footballers
Uruguayan Primera División players
Liverpool F.C. (Montevideo) players